Mohamed Koné (born February 28, 1984) is an Ivorian former professional footballer.

Career
He moved to the Burmese club Yangon United on loan from Thai Premier League club Chonburi F.C. in 2009 after finishing as second top goalscorer with 14 goals in the 2009 Thai Premier League.
According to the Chonburi fan club, Koné is one of Chonburi's best players of all time, and they were shocked to find out that he has never played for a bigger club. He has most recently been linked with a move to England or France, with reported interest from Preston North End and FC Lorient.
He now plays for TOT FC in the Thai Premier League, and frequently performs a moonwalk after scoring goals.

Honours
 Krung Thai Bank F.C.
 Thai Premier League: 2003–04
 Chonburi F.C.
 Thai Premier League: 2007
 Kor Royal Cup: 2009
 Muang Thong United F.C.
 Thai Premier League: 2010
 Thai Premier League: 2012
 Kor Royal Cup: 2010

Notes and references

1984 births
Living people
Footballers from Abidjan
Ivorian footballers
Mohamed Kone
Mohamed Kone
Mohamed Kone
Mohamed Kone
Mohamed Kone
K.V. Mechelen players
Hoang Anh Gia Lai FC players
V.League 1 players
Yangon United F.C. players
Expatriate footballers in Thailand
Expatriate footballers in Myanmar
Expatriate footballers in Vietnam
Expatriate footballers in Belgium
Ivorian expatriate sportspeople in Thailand
Ivorian expatriate sportspeople in Belgium
Association football forwards